USS LST-476 was a United States Navy  used in the Asiatic-Pacific Theater during World War II.

Construction
LST-476 was laid down on 5 August 1942, under Maritime Commission (MARCOM) contract, MC hull 996, by  Kaiser Shipyards, Yard No. 4, Richmond, California; launched on 10 October 1942, sponsored by Mrs. D.T. Williams; and commissioned on 4 April 1943.

Service history
During the war, LST-476 was assigned to the Pacific Theater of Operations. She took part in the Gilbert Islands operation, December 1943; the Occupation of Kwajalein and Majuro Atolls in February 1944; the Battle of Hollandia in April 1944; the Battle of Guam in July and August 1944; and the Battle of Sansapor in August 1944.

Post-war service
Following the war, LST-476 performed occupation duty in the Far East until February 1946. Upon her return to the United States, she was decommissioned on 12 February 1946 and struck from the Navy list on 31 October 1947. On 1 June 1948, the ship was sold to the Puget Sound Bridge & Dredging Company, Seattle, Washington.

Honors and awards
LST-476 earned five battle stars for her World War II service.

References

Bibliography

External links

 

LST-1-class tank landing ships
World War II amphibious warfare vessels of the United States
Ships built in Richmond, California
1942 ships
S3-M2-K2 ships